Pita Naruma (born 27 November 1959) is a Fijian former rugby union player. He played as flanker.

Career
He played for Suva in the Farebrother-Sullivan Trophy between 1988 and 1991, along the likes of Koli Rakoroi, Salacieli Naivilawasa, Ilikimi Torosi, Peni Rakai, Nemani Matirewa, Aisake Nadolo, Mosese Taga, Tomasi Cama, Pauliasi Tabulutu and Alifereti Dere.
Naruma debuted in 1988 for Fiji during the match against Tonga, in Apia, on 31 May. He also was part of the 1991 Rugby World Cup roster, playing two matches in the tournament and scoring his only try in the tournament, in the match against Romania. His last cap with the Fiji national team was against Samoa, at Apia, on 5 June 1993. He also played for Fiji Sevens in the 1985, 1986 and 1988 Hong Kong Sevens tournaments., as well for the Fiji Barbarians.

Notes

External links
Pita Naruma international stats

Fiji international rugby union players
Fijian rugby union players
Rugby union flankers
1959 births
I-Taukei Fijian people
Living people